The Copa de Guatemala is the top knock-out club football competition in Guatemala. Since 2003, it is named Copa Centenario.

List of winners

Titles

References

External links
Guatemala - List of Cup Winners

Football competitions in Guatemala
National association football cups